Xavier Cowley-Tuioti (born 12 September 1994) is a New Zealand rugby union player who plays for  for the 2022 Super Rugby Pacific season, having been named in the squad for the rescheduled Round 1. His playing position is lock. He was also named in the  squad for the 2021 Bunnings NPC.

References

1994 births
New Zealand rugby union players
Living people
Rugby union locks
North Harbour rugby union players
Moana Pasifika players